Poilly-lez-Gien (literally Poilly near Gien) is a commune in the Loiret department, located in north-central France.

See also
 Communes of the Loiret department

References

Poillylezgien
Berry, France
Loiret communes articles needing translation from French Wikipedia